Bran is the hard outer layer of cereal grains.

Bran may also refer to:

Places
 Bran, Brașov, a commune in Brașov County, Romania
 Bran Castle, a medieval German castle in Romania, wrongly associated with Vlad Țepeş ("Dracula")
 Bran, a village in Golăiești Commune, Iași County, Romania
 Bran, Charente-Maritime, a commune in the Charente-Maritime département in France
 , a place in the parish of Os Ánxeles in the Galician council of Oroso, Spain
 Castell Dinas Brân, a castle in Llangollen, Wales

People
 Bran Mutimirović, Serbian prince
 Bran Drobnjak, founder of the Drobnjaci clan
 Bran Ardchenn, king of  Leinster
 Bran Becc mac Murchado, king of Leinster
 Bran Ferren, American designer and inventor
 Guto Nyth Brân, legendary Welsh athlete

Characters
 Brân the Blessed, a character in Welsh mythology
 Bran Mak Morn, the last King of the Picts in Robert E. Howard's fiction
 Bran mac Febail, the protagonist of Immram Brain (The Voyage of Bran), a tale from Irish mythology
 Bran Stark, a character from A Song of Ice and Fire by George R. R. Martin

Other
 Broadband Radio Access Network (BRAN), a European Telecommunications Standards Institute project involving low-cost, high-capacity radio links
 A nickname (abbreviation) for "Brandon"
 Accademia della Crusca, also known as "The Bran"; crusca is Italian for bran
 Bran (exoplanet) (HAT-P-36b), a hot Jupiter-type exoplanet orbiting Tuiren (HAT-P-36)

See also
 List of Celtic deities: Brân, Celtic for “Raven”, Celtic god 
 Slavic names, see Bron, Bran: to protect, to defend
 Related Romanian place-names
 Brănești (disambiguation)
 Braniște (disambiguation)
 Braniștea (disambiguation)
 Branle, Baroque dance (Spanish form)

Given names derived from birds